Bø is a village in the Tørdal district of Drangedal municipality, Norway. It is located on the northern end of Bjorvatnet lake.

Villages in Vestfold og Telemark